Lilia Biktyakova (born 2 February 1979) is an Uzbekistani former professional tennis player.

Tennis career
A left-handed player from Tashkent, Biktyakova represented the Uzbekistan Fed Cup team in the late 1990s. From her 11 Fed Cup ties she won two singles and two doubles rubbers. In addition to the Fed Cup she also competed for Uzbekistan at the 1998 Asian Games. She twice appeared as a wildcard in the main draw of the Tashkent Open, in 1999 and 2000.

Biktyakova was a four-time All-American during her collegiate tennis career for Georgia College from 1998 to 2001. She was Georgia College's Female Athlete of the Year in 2001.

Personal life
Biktyakova married Georgia College golfer Alex McMichael.

Her younger sister, Luiza, was also a tennis player, competing at Fed Cup level and for Georgia College.

References

External links
 
 
 

1979 births
Living people
Uzbekistani female tennis players
Georgia College Bobcats
College women's tennis players in the United States
Sportspeople from Tashkent
Uzbekistani emigrants to the United States
Tennis players at the 1998 Asian Games
Asian Games competitors for Uzbekistan
20th-century Uzbekistani women